Daphne Elizabeth Brown (1948–2011) was an American architect who was posthumously inducted into the Alaska Women's Hall of Fame and awarded the Kumin Award from the American Institute of Architects, the highest recognition for architectural achievement in Alaska.

Biography
Daphne Elizabeth Brown was born April 28, 1948 in Manchester, New Hampshire to Sophie Mary (née Rowbotham) and Ridgley Staniford Brown. In her childhood, her family relocated to Gardner, Massachusetts and she attended school at Walnut Hill School in Natick, Massachusetts. She continued her education at the University of Pennsylvania, graduating with a bachelor's degree in 1970 and in 1973, earned her Masters in architecture from the University of Washington.

In 1975, Brown moved to Alaska and began her career working for Edwin Butler Crittenden at CCC Architects in Anchorage. She began working with Kumin Associates in 1987 and in 1988, her work was recognized in the American Institute of Architects (AIA) traveling exhibition to acknowledge the contributions of women architects. The exhibition, entitled Many More: Women in Architecture, 1978-1988, featured 77 projects accepted from women architects by the committee. She was honored with a Loeb fellowship from the Harvard Graduate School of Design in 1989.

Brown was involved in many corollary support organizations, serving as the chair of the state licensing board for architecture, engineering and land surveying; the chair of the board for subdivisions and boundaries; and the chair of the planning and zoning commission. In 2002, she began work on a project to expand and renovate the Anchorage Museum at Rasmuson Center. Brown's role in the project was to ensure that the design met with the "technical, climatic, structural, and seismic" requirements of Anchorage codes and conditions, She served as the overall project manager of the 90,000 sq ft addition and remodeling of the existing space. In 2007, she became a partner in Kumin Associates.

She died of uterine cancer on December 10, 2011 in Anchorage, Alaska. In 2013, she was posthumously honored as an inductee into the Alaska Women's Hall of Fame and was awarded the Kumin Award from the AIA, the highest recognition for architectural achievement in Alaska.

References 

1948 births
2011 deaths
People from Manchester, New Hampshire
University of Pennsylvania alumni
University of Washington College of Built Environments alumni
American women architects
Architects from New Hampshire
Architects from Alaska
20th-century American architects
21st-century American architects
Deaths from uterine cancer
Deaths from cancer in Alaska
21st-century American women artists
20th-century American women